"Move" is a song co-written and recorded by American country music artist Luke Bryan. It was released to American country radio on July 25, 2016 as the fifth official single from his 2015 album Kill the Lights. Bryan wrote this song with Michael Carter and Jay Clementi.

Background
The song was written by Luke Bryan, Michael Carter, and Jay Clementi.  The song is about a Northern girl who moved to the South, where she "got in with some Southern belles" and her moves became even more attractive.  It was released to radio with an add date of July 25, 2016.

Commercial performance
The song first entered the Hot Country Songs chart at number 43 in August 2015 and became available for download with the release of the album Kill the Lights, selling 8,000 copies in its first week. It re-entered the chart at number 42 nearly a year later after being released as a single. The song has sold 254,000 copies in the US as of January 2017.

Music video
The music video was directed by Shane Drake and premiered in September 2016. The video features Luke performing in a club with his band and a female dancer dancing next door. The dancer then breaks through the wall at the final chorus and dances on stage with Luke and the band. Luke is dressed in a baseball cap and T-shirt for the duration of the video, until the final scene when he is dancing with the girl, in which he wears a black suit and white undershirt.

Chart performance

Weekly charts

Year end charts

Certifications

References

2015 songs
2016 singles
Luke Bryan songs
Capitol Records Nashville singles
Music videos directed by Shane Drake
Songs about dancing
Songs written by Luke Bryan
Songs written by Michael Carter (musician)